SCSC is an acronym which may refer to:

Safety-Critical Systems Club the UK's professional network for sharing knowledge about safety-critical systems
Santa Clara Swim Club, a youth swim team in Santa Clara, CA.
Sheffield City Swimming Club, a swimming club based in Sheffield
Standing Council of Scottish Chiefs, an organization composed of the chiefs of many Scottish clans
State Civil Service Commission
Superconducting Super Collider, a cancelled particle accelerator

See also
 SC2 (disambiguation)
 SC (disambiguation)